This is a list of 290 species in Ataenius, a genus of aphodiine dung beetles in the family Scarabaeidae.

Ataenius species

 Ataenius abancay Stebnicka, 2005 c g
 Ataenius abditus (Haldeman, 1848) i c g b
 Ataenius aciculus Hinton, 1936 c g
 Ataenius acutulus (Schmidt, 1913) c g
 Ataenius aequalis Harold, 1880 i c g
 Ataenius aequatorialis Petrovitz, 1961 c g
 Ataenius africanus Endrödi, 1967 c g
 Ataenius alternatus (Melsheimer, 1845) i c g b
 Ataenius ambaritae Stebnicka, 1988 c g
 Ataenius angulatus Petrovitz, 1964 c g
 Ataenius annanus Stebnicka & Howden, 1997 c g
 Ataenius aphodiiformis Bordat & Théry, 2012 c g
 Ataenius apicalis Hinton, 1937 i c g
 Ataenius arenosus Harold, 1868 c g
 Ataenius arrowi Hinton, 1936 c g
 Ataenius asper Petrovitz, 1975 c g
 Ataenius atramentarius (Erichson, 1847) c
 Ataenius attenuator Harold, 1874 c g
 Ataenius australasiae (Boheman, 1858) c g
 Ataenius australis Harold, 1875 c g
 Ataenius balthasari Petrovitz, 1973 c g
 Ataenius barberi Cartwright, 1974 i c g
 Ataenius basiceps Lea, 1923 c g
 Ataenius beattyi Chapin, 1940 c g
 Ataenius benarabyensis Stebnicka & Howden, 1997 c g
 Ataenius bicolor Petrovitz, 1963 c g
 Ataenius biroi (Endrödi, 1951) c g
 Ataenius bispinulosus Schmidt, 1911 c g
 Ataenius blapoides Balthasar, 1947 c g
 Ataenius bolivarensis Stebnicka, 2007 c g
 Ataenius bolivari Stebnicka, 2001 c g
 Ataenius borgmeieri Hinton, 1936 c g
 Ataenius borjae Stebnicka, 2005 c g
 Ataenius brevicollis (Wollaston, 1854) i c g
 Ataenius brevis Fall, 1930 i c g
 Ataenius brevitarsis Petrovitz, 1964 c g
 Ataenius brouni (Sharp, 1876) c g
 Ataenius buenavistae Stebnicka, 2001 c g
 Ataenius caesoides (Fairmaire, 1899) c g
 Ataenius caicarae Stebnicka, 2005 c g
 Ataenius californicus Horn, 1887 i c g
 Ataenius canoasus Stebnicka, 2007 c g
 Ataenius carinatipennis Petrovitz, 1973 c g
 Ataenius carinator HAROLD, 1874 i c g b
 Ataenius cartago Stebnicka, 2007 c g
 Ataenius cartwrighti Chalumeau & Gruner, 1974 c g
 Ataenius castaniellus Bates, 1887 i c g
 Ataenius catarinaensis Stebnicka, 2007 c g
 Ataenius catenulatus (Erichson, 1847) c g
 Ataenius cavagnaroi Cartwright, 1970 c g
 Ataenius ceylonensis Schmidt, 1912 c g
 Ataenius chapini Hinton, 1937 c g
 Ataenius chilensis (Solier, 1851) c g
 Ataenius chinacotae Stebnicka, 2007 c g
 Ataenius circulusbrumalis Petrovitz, 1964 c g
 Ataenius clavatus Schmidt, 1916 c g
 Ataenius clitellarius Petrovitz, 1973 c g
 Ataenius cochabambae Stebnicka, 2005 c g
 Ataenius cognatus (LeConte, 1858) i c g b  (slender dung beetle)
 Ataenius columbicus Harold, 1880 c g
 Ataenius communis Hinton, 1936 c g
 Ataenius complicatus Harold, 1869 c g
 Ataenius confertus Fall, 1909 i c g b
 Ataenius coriarius Schmidt, 1912 c g
 Ataenius corporaali Boucomont, 1924 c g
 Ataenius corrosus Chapin, 1940 c g
 Ataenius costulifer Balthasar, 1941 c g
 Ataenius crenaticollis Petrovitz, 1973 c g
 Ataenius crenatipennis (MacLeay, 1871) c g
 Ataenius crenator Harold, 1876 c g
 Ataenius crenatostriatus (Blanchard, 1843) c g
 Ataenius crenulatus Schmidt, 1910 i c g
 Ataenius cribrithorax Bates, 1887 i c g
 Ataenius cristobalensis Cook & Peck, 2000 c g
 Ataenius cucutae Stebnicka, 2007 c g
 Ataenius cylindrus Horn, 1871 i c g
 Ataenius dentatus Koshantschikov, 1916 c g
 Ataenius depilis Petrovitz, 1976 c g
 Ataenius deserti Blackburn, 1894 c g
 Ataenius desertus Horn, 1871 i c g b
 Ataenius ecruensis Stebnicka and Lago, 2005 i c g
 Ataenius edungalbae Stebnicka & Howden, 1997 c g
 Ataenius elegans Harold, 1868 c g
 Ataenius elisaensis Stebnicka, 2002 c g
 Ataenius elongatulus (Macleay, 1888) c g
 Ataenius elongatus (Palisot de Beauvois, 1811) c g
 Ataenius endroedyyoungai Endrödi, 1973 c g
 Ataenius erinaceus Petrovitz, 1961 c g
 Ataenius eringundae Stebnicka & Howden, 1997 c g
 Ataenius erratus Fall, 1930 i c g
 Ataenius europaeus Quiel, 1910 c g
 Ataenius eurynotus Lea, 1923 c g
 Ataenius excisicollis Petrovitz, 1961 c g
 Ataenius exiguus Brown, 1932 i c g b
 Ataenius fattigi Cartwright, 1948 i c g b
 Ataenius floreanae Cook & Peck, 2000 c g
 Ataenius forgiei Bordat & Théry, 2012 c g
 Ataenius forsteri Balthasar, 1960 c g
 Ataenius freyi Petrovitz, 1961 c g
 Ataenius gammonensis Stebnicka & Howden, 1997 c g
 Ataenius garamas Peyerimhoff, 1929 c g
 Ataenius gascoyneensis Stebnicka & Howden, 1997 c g
 Ataenius gibbus Blackburn, 1904 c g
 Ataenius gilesi Stebnicka & Howden, 1997 c g
 Ataenius glabriventris Schmidt, 1911 c g
 Ataenius glaseri Cartwright, 1974 i c g
 Ataenius gracilis (Melsheimer, 1845) i c g b
 Ataenius granocostatus Schmidt, 1912 c g
 Ataenius gruneri Chalumeau, 1979 c g
 Ataenius guanacastae Stebnicka, 2005 c g
 Ataenius guayasi Stebnicka, 2001 c g
 Ataenius gungareei Stebnicka & Howden, 1997 c g
 Ataenius guriensis Stebnicka, 2005 c g
 Ataenius heinekeni (Wollaston, 1854) i c g
 Ataenius hesperius Cartwright, 1974 i c g b
 Ataenius hirsutus Horn, 1871 i c g b
 Ataenius hispaniolae Chalumeau, 1982 c g
 Ataenius hispidus Harold, 1867 c g
 Ataenius holopubescens Hinton, 1938 c g
 Ataenius horticola Harold, 1869 c g
 Ataenius howdeni Chalumeau, 1978 c g
 Ataenius hrubanti Balthasar, 1967 c g
 Ataenius huanus Stebnicka, 2007 c g
 Ataenius humptydooensis Stebnicka & Howden, 1997 c g
 Ataenius hygrophilus Paulian, 1947 c g
 Ataenius icanus Balthasar, 1941 c g
 Ataenius illaetabilis Lea, 1923 c g
 Ataenius imbricatoides Schmidt, 1909 c g
 Ataenius imbricatus (Melsheimer, 1845) i c g b
 Ataenius imparilis Blackburn, 1904 c g
 Ataenius impiger Schmidt, 1916 c g
 Ataenius impressus (Petrovitz, 1963) c g
 Ataenius indutus Petrovitz, 1961 c g
 Ataenius inquisitus Horn, 1887 i c g b
 Ataenius insculptus Horn, 1887 i c g b
 Ataenius insolitus Schmidt, 1909 c g
 Ataenius insulae Chalumeau & Gruner, 1974 c g
 Ataenius insularis Lea, 1923 c g
 Ataenius integricollis Lea, 1923 c g
 Ataenius intermedius Bates, 1887 c g
 Ataenius iquitosae Stebnicka, 2007 c g
 Ataenius isabelae Franz, 1985 c g
 Ataenius jamaicensis Chapin, 1940 c g
 Ataenius jardinensis Stebnicka, 2002 c g
 Ataenius jelineki Chalumeau, 1982 c g
 Ataenius kapalgaensis Stebnicka & Howden, 1997 c g
 Ataenius klapperichi Howden, 1978 c g
 Ataenius kochi Balthasar, 1941 c g
 Ataenius koebelei Blackburn, 1904 c g
 Ataenius koelleri Balthasar, 1963 c g
 Ataenius koghianus Paulian, 1991 c g
 Ataenius lamarensis Stebnicka, 2007 c g
 Ataenius lamotteiroyi Bordat, 1992 c g
 Ataenius lanei Petrovitz, 1973 c g
 Ataenius languidus Schmidt, 1911 i c g
 Ataenius latus Petrovitz, 1963 c g
 Ataenius lenkoi Petrovitz, 1973 c g
 Ataenius liogaster Bates, 1887 i c g
 Ataenius lobatus Horn, 1871 i c g
 Ataenius londrinae Stebnicka, 2007 c g
 Ataenius longiclavus Petrovitz, 1970 c g
 Ataenius luctuosus (Burmeister, 1877) c g
 Ataenius luteomargo Chapin, 1940 c g
 Ataenius madagassicus Bordat, 1990 c g
 Ataenius maghribinicus Baraud, 1985 c g
 Ataenius martinezi Petrovitz, 1973 c g
 Ataenius miamii Cartwright, 1934 i c g b
 Ataenius michelii Chalumeau, 1978 c g
 Ataenius microtrichopterus Lea, 1923 c g
 Ataenius millstreamae Stebnicka & Howden, 1997 c g
 Ataenius montanus Schmidt, 1911 c g
 Ataenius monteithi Paulian, 1991 c g
 Ataenius monticola Paulian, 1940 c g
 Ataenius montreuili Bordat & Théry, 2012 c g
 Ataenius morator Harold, 1869 c g
 Ataenius murchisoni Stebnicka & Howden, 1997 c g
 Ataenius nakpandurii Endrödi, 1973 c g
 Ataenius nanus (Degeer, 1774) c g
 Ataenius napoensis Stebnicka, 2007 c g
 Ataenius nigricans Paulian, 1933 c g
 Ataenius noques Stebnicka, 2007 c g
 Ataenius noronhai Stebnicka, 2007 c g
 Ataenius nudus Blackburn, 1904 c g
 Ataenius nugator Harold, 1880 c g
 Ataenius oaxacaensis Stebnicka & Lago, 2005 c g
 Ataenius ocumarensis Stebnicka, 2001 c g
 Ataenius oklahomensis Brown, 1930 i c g
 Ataenius onkonensis Stebnicka, 2005 c g
 Ataenius opacipennis Schmidt, 1910 c g
 Ataenius opatrinus Harold, 1867 i c g
 Ataenius opatroides (Blanchard, 1846) c g
 Ataenius ovatulus Horn, 1871 i c g b
 Ataenius pacificus (Sharp, 1879) i c g
 Ataenius palmaritoensis Stebnicka, 2007 c g
 Ataenius palmerstoni Blackburn, 1891 c g
 Ataenius palustris (Montrouzier, 1860) c g
 Ataenius panamensis Hinton, 1936 c g
 Ataenius parallelipennis Petrovitz, 1973 c g
 Ataenius parvus Lea, 1923 c g
 Ataenius patescens Scudder, 1893 c g
 Ataenius pearlensis Stebnicka, 2006 c g
 Ataenius peregianensis Stebnicka & Howden, 1997 c g
 Ataenius peregrinator Harold, 1877 i c g
 Ataenius pereirai Petrovitz, 1970 c g
 Ataenius perforatus Harold, 1867 c g
 Ataenius pertuga Balthasar, 1961 c g
 Ataenius petrovitzi Balthasar, 1960 c g
 Ataenius picinus Harold, 1867 i c g b  (pitchy scarab)
 Ataenius platensis (Blanchard, 1847) i c g b
 Ataenius plaumanni Petrovitz, 1973 c g
 Ataenius polyglyptus Bates, 1887 c g
 Ataenius pseudimparilis Stebnicka & Howden, 1997 c g
 Ataenius pseudocarinator Balthasar, 1947 c g
 Ataenius pseudoclavatus Stebnicka, 2005 c g
 Ataenius pseudocommunis Stebnicka, 2001 c g
 Ataenius pseudostercorator Stebnicka, 2003 c g
 Ataenius pseudousingeri Galante, Stebnicka & Verdu, 2003 c g
 Ataenius punctatohirsutus Schmidt, 1909 c g
 Ataenius puncticollis LeConte, 1868 i g
 Ataenius punctipennis Harold, 1868 c g
 Ataenius purator Harold, 1868 c g
 Ataenius quintanaroo Stebnicka, 2006 c g
 Ataenius raccurti Chalumeau, 1978 c g
 Ataenius rakovici Bordat & Théry, 2012 c g
 Ataenius raslani Bordat & Théry, 2012 c g
 Ataenius raucus (Schmidt, 1908) c g
 Ataenius restructus (Wickham, 1912) c g
 Ataenius robustus Horn, 1871 i c g b  (saline prairie scarab beetle)
 Ataenius rosinae Balthasar, 1967 c g
 Ataenius rubrotessellatus (Blanchard, 1846) c g
 Ataenius saltae Stebnicka, 2007 c g
 Ataenius santarosae Stebnicka, 2007 c g
 Ataenius saulensis Stebnicka, 2006 c g
 Ataenius scabrelloides Petrovitz, 1962 i c g
 Ataenius scabrellus Schmidt, 1909 i c g
 Ataenius scalptifrons Bates, 1887 c g
 Ataenius schmidti Stebnicka, 2003 c g
 Ataenius sculptilis Harold, 1868 c g
 Ataenius sculptor Harold, 1868 i c g
 Ataenius scutellaris Harold, 1867 c g
 Ataenius seaforthensis Stebnicka & Howden, 1997 c g
 Ataenius semicoecus (Macleay, 1888) c g
 Ataenius semicornutus (MacLeay, 1871) c g
 Ataenius setiger BATES, 1887 i c g b
 Ataenius setosus Schmidt, 1909 c g
 Ataenius seydeli Endrödi, 1964 c g
 Ataenius siminasus Petrovitz, 1973 c g
 Ataenius simplicipes (Mulsant & Rey, 1870) c g
 Ataenius skelleyi Stebnicka, 2007 c g
 Ataenius sparsicollis Blackburn, 1904 c g
 Ataenius speculator Blackburn, 1891 c g
 Ataenius spinipennis Lea, 1923 c g
 Ataenius spretulus (Haldeman, 1848) i c g b  (black turfgrass ataenius)
 Ataenius stebnickae Bordat & Théry, 2012 c g
 Ataenius steinheili Harold, 1874 c g
 Ataenius stephani Cartwright, 1974 i c g b
 Ataenius stercorator (Fabricius, 1775) i c g
 Ataenius striatocrenatus (Fairmaire, 1889) c g
 Ataenius strigatus (Say, 1823) i c g b
 Ataenius strigicaudus Bates, 1887 c g
 Ataenius strigifrons Schmidt, 1920 c g
 Ataenius suineata Deloya, 2012 c g
 Ataenius synnotensis Stebnicka & Howden, 1997 c g
 Ataenius talpoides Stebnicka, 2001 c g
 Ataenius tambopatae Stebnicka, 2001 c g
 Ataenius tarumensis Stebnicka, 2007 c g
 Ataenius temperei Chalumeau & Gruner, 1974 c g
 Ataenius terminalis (Chevrolat, 1864) c g
 Ataenius texanus Harold, 1874 i c g b
 Ataenius tindalensis Stebnicka & Howden, 1997 c g
 Ataenius tomentosus Petrovitz, 1969 c g
 Ataenius torridus Blackburn, 1892 c g
 Ataenius tovarensis Stebnicka, 2001 c g
 Ataenius tuberculatus Schmidt, 1911 c g
 Ataenius uriarrae Stebnicka & Howden, 1997 c g
 Ataenius usingeri Hinton, 1936 c g
 Ataenius utahensis Cartwright, 1974 i c g
 Ataenius vandykei Cartwright, 1974 i
 Ataenius variopunctatus Schmidt, 1922 c g
 Ataenius versicolor Schmidt, 1916 c g
 Ataenius vethianus Schmidt, 1909 c g
 Ataenius vinacoensis Stebnicka, 2006 c g
 Ataenius walkeri Blackburn, 1904 c g
 Ataenius walterhorni Balthasar, 1938 c g
 Ataenius waltherhorni Balthasar, 1938 i
 Ataenius warisensis Stebnicka, 1998 c g
 Ataenius wenzeli Horn, 1887 c g
 Ataenius wenzelii HORN, 1887 i b
 Ataenius windjanae Stebnicka & Howden, 1997 c g
 Ataenius yungasus Stebnicka, 2001 c g

Data sources: i = ITIS, c = Catalogue of Life, g = GBIF, b = Bugguide.net

References

Ataenius